Citylink Edmond is a public transit operator in Edmond, Oklahoma which began operating on July 1, 2009. Citylink operates 6 routes. 5 routes run within Edmond, and one, the Expresslink, provides commuter service to Downtown Oklahoma City.

The Citylink Transfer Center is located in downtown Edmond at the Festival Market Place, one block west of Broadway on First Street.

Citylink also provides paratransit service within Edmond's city limits.

Routes
1: Boulevard-Danforth
2: Fretz-15th
3A: 2nd-Bryant-15th
3B: Broadway-33rd-Boulevard
4: UCO Broncholink
100X: Expresslink

References

External links
 Edmond page

Bus transportation in Oklahoma
Edmond, Oklahoma
RATP Group